Central Business District, Singapore (CBD) may refer to:

 Central Area, Singapore, the city centre of the country
 Downtown Core, the urban core of the Central Area which contains the CBD proper and its surrounding developments
 Jurong Lake District, also known as Singapore's second CBD